Cathy Henkel is a South African documentary filmmaker who lives and works in Australia. Her works have typically focused on subjects of environmental activism, and to a lesser extent, the performing arts.

Career 
Her career in documentary film and television writing, directing and producing began in 1988. She had previously worked as an artistic director for an Australian amateur theatre company, the Shopfront Theater for Young People, for which she also wrote and directed performances. Her first documentary film Heroes of our time (1991) provided the first inside look at Greenpeace during one of its 'direct action' campaigns confronting oil company Caltex.

In 1992, Henkel met Jeff Canin on a sea turtle nesting beach in Queensland and they became partners in life and in work. Following the birth of their daughter Sam Lara, they formed Hatchling Productions with the intention of producing social issue and community-based documentaries. They also established a digital post-production editing studio in the northern rivers region of New South Wales. In 1999, Henkel wrote and directed Walking Through a Minefield (1999) which documented the blockade of the proposed Jabiluka uranium mine in Australia's Northern Territory. The film was financed by SBS Independent, the Australian Film Commission and the New South Wales Film and Television Office.

In 2003, Henkel wrote and directed her first TV documentary for the Australian Broadcasting Corporation entitled The man who stole my mother's face. The film followed Henkel's own search for justice for her mother following a traumatic sexual assault, and was awarded Best Documentary at the Tribeca Film Festival in New York in 2004. Henkel has twice explored the intersecting topics of deforestation and climate change with The Burning Season (2008) and Rise of the Eco-Warriors (2014). Henkel was the writer and director of both projects, which involved extensive travel and documentation of the expanding palm oil plantations of Indonesia and their social and environmental impacts.

Henkel completed a Masters (2002) and PhD (2011) at the Queensland University of Technology.

While many of Henkel's films have explored the topic of environmental activism, others have reflected her passion for the creative arts. These include Show Me the Magic (2012) which explored the life and work of Australian cinematographer Don McAlpine and I told you I was ill: The Life and Legacy of Spike Milligan (2005).

Henkel's films have received two IF Awards for Best Documentary. Personal accolades include being named SPAA Documentary Producer of the Year in 2009, receiving an ACS Award and an Emmy award nomination.

In 2014 she was appointed Director of the West Australian Screen Academy at Edith Cowan University. She had previously lived and worked in Brisbane, Queensland, Australia where she managed the production company, Virgo Productions.

Early career 
Henkel was born in Johannesburg, South Africa and moved to Australia when she was 18. Henkel has said that she felt ashamed of her white South African heritage, referring to it as "wearing a badge of the oppressor." In 1978, Henkel moved to Clunes and studied at Lismore's Northern Rivers College to become a teacher. She moved to Sydney in 1982 after taking a job as a director at Shopfront.

Trial of Rolf Harris 
Henkel first met entertainer Rolf Harris and his wife Alwen Hughes at a South African hotel where Henkel was a waitress in the early 1970s. He encouraged her to go to Australia and their friendship spanned over forty years. In 2014, Henkel was called to testify as a witness at Rolf Harris' trial for multiple child sexual assault charges. She had unintentionally introduced Harris to one of his victims, 13-year-old Tonya Lee in 1986 when Henkel was artistic director of an Australian theatre group, Shopfront Theater for Young People, on tour in the United Kingdom. Henkel felt pressured verbally by Harris' brother to deny assault allegations, but she resisted, testifying that while she did not see the abuse occur herself, the circumstances made the abuse possible. Rolf Harris was found guilty on 12 charges of indecent assault against four girls spanning a period from 1968 to 1986.

Rise of the Eco-Warriors 
According to Henkel, Rise of the Eco-Warriors began with a phonecall she received from Microsoft Partners in Learning. Through a subsequent Virgo Productions partnership with Microsoft, the project developed into something she described as "too good to be true" as it focussed on engaging school students around the world. Henkel described her intention to make a 3D version of Rise of the Eco-Warriors as being like "the Avatar story, but real", though a 3D version of the film was never released. The project put out a casting call for young people to audition for the film in 2011, with entries closing on 11 April. In total the project received 215 applications from 26 countries, something Henkel later attributed to "the power of Facebook". The chosen group of young people would ultimately spend 100 days in the jungle of Borneo with the Dayaks, learning about the expansion of the palm oil industry and its environmental and cultural impacts.

The project's home on the internet was established at http://anactionmovie.com  in 2010 and migrated to http://ecowarriorsrise.com in 2013.

Awards
Cathy Henkel won the award of Honorary Mention at the 2010 Byron Bay International Film Festival.

Collaborators

Jeff Canin 
Like Henkel, Canin grew up in apartheid South Africa. He left South Africa at the age of 20, shifting his focus from political to environmental issues. By 24, he had completed a Bachelor of Environmental Science degree in London. He followed his passion for sea turtles to a job with Greenpeace as the International Sea Turtle Campaigner. He served in the position for  years in London, Florida and Amsterdam before moving to Australia where he began to produce films. In 1992 the pair launched Hatchling Films and went on to release Walking through a minefield (1999) which followed the Australian anti-nuclear movement's response to the proposal to mine uranium at Jabiluka in Kakadu National Park. Later collaborations include The Burning Season (2008), I told you I was ill: The Life and Legacy of Spike Milligan (2005), The man who stole my mother's face (2003) and many other films. Canin is a former Coordinator of the Clunes Technology Centre. He launched a new production company entitled Green Turtle Films and embarked on his first project without Henkel, the feature-length documentary Two Degrees (2013).

Trish Lake 
Henkel has collaborated with producer Trish Lake of Freshwater Pictures on several of her productions, including The Burning Season (2008), Show Me the Magic (2012) and Dance for Me (in production).

References 

South African documentary film directors
People from Johannesburg
South African film directors
South African women film directors
Living people
Women documentary filmmakers
Year of birth missing (living people)